New Farm Park ferry wharf is located on the northern side of the Brisbane River serving the Brisbane suburb of New Farm in Queensland, Australia. It is served by RiverCity Ferries and was also served by a Cross River service to Norman Park. The latter service was suspended in July 2020 and formally cancelled in October 2020.

Geography

The ferry wharf is located at the end of Brunswick Street. One of the Brisbane tramway routes ran down to the river along Brunswick Street, providing connectivity with the ferry. Today, bus services operate this route. The ferry wharf also provides access to New Farm Park and the Brisbane Powerhouse arts and entertainment centre.

History
The wharf was originally known as Brunswick Street wharf as it predated the existence of New Farm Park, having been in use at least as early as 1892. During World War II it was part of Naval Base Brisbane.

The wharf sustained moderate damage during the January 2011 Brisbane floods. It reopened after repairs on 14 February 2011.

References

External links

Ferry wharves in Brisbane
New Farm, Queensland